Heike Jensen (born 21 July 1965) is a German volleyball player. She competed in the women's tournament at the 1988 Summer Olympics.

References

External links
 

1965 births
Living people
German women's volleyball players
Olympic volleyball players of East Germany
Volleyball players at the 1988 Summer Olympics
Sportspeople from Dresden